Apodaca is a surname. Notable people with the surname include:

Antonia Apodaca (1923–2020), American musician 
Bob Apodaca (born 1950), American professional baseball player
Felicitas Apodaca (1912–1997), American community activist
Jerry Apodaca (born 1934), 24th governor of New Mexico
Juan Ruiz de Apodaca, 1st Count of Venadito (1754–1835), Spanish naval officer
Tom Apodaca (born 1957), American politician
Nathan Apodaca (born 1983), American viral video creator

See also
Apodaca
Apodaca family of New Mexico